A minibeast is any of a variety of arthropods and other invertebrates, including spiders, ants, termites, butterflies, bees, wasps, flies, woodlice, and many others. The United Kingdom-based Young People's Charitable Trust defines them as "small animals" in a factsheet written for young readers. There is a "Minibeast Zooseum" in Michigan dedicated to invertebrates. Minibeasts, as indicated by their name, are generally 'mini' or small.

The study of minibeasts is common as part of the primary school curriculum. Studying minibeasts is a very effective way to observe many biological concepts first hand, which is not possible with many larger animals. Life cycles, food chains, and bodily structure and function are just some of the basic elements of biological science which can be easily explained using minibeasts. "Bugs Alive!" at Melbourne Museum features a huge number of live minibeasts with detailed information about them, while services such as "Minibeast Wildlife" and "Travelbugs"  take live minibeast to school and provide educational resources.mini beasts is the worst thing ever said by ...

References

External links 
National Curriculum in Action Minibeast Tree Diagrams
Wildlife Trust Minibeast Ride, with National Curriculum considerations
Minibeast Wildlife Minibeast education, resources, and photographs
Melbourne Museum - Bugs Alive! Resources, exhibition information, interactive web games
Travelbugs Mobile minibeast education

Arthropods and humans
Science education